Sphenomorphus transversus  is a species of skink found in the Solomon Islands.

References

transversus
Taxa named by Allen Eddy Greer
Taxa named by Frederick Stanley Parker
Reptiles described in 1971
Reptiles of the Solomon Islands